Crivella is a surname. Notable people with the surname include:

Jonas Crivella (born 1988), Brazilian water polo player
Marcelo Crivella (born 1957), Brazilian Evangelical pastor, gospel singer, and politician

See also
Civella
Crivelli (surname)
Crivello